The Seneca Avenue station is a station on the BMT Myrtle Avenue Line of the New York City Subway. Located at the intersection of Palmetto Street and Seneca Avenue in Ridgewood, Queens, it is served by the M train at all times. The station opened in 1915 as part of the Dual Contracts.

History
This station opened on February 22, 1915 by the Brooklyn Rapid Transit Company as part of a project to elevate a portion of the Myrtle Avenue Line, which had run at street level. This work was completed as part of the Dual Contracts.

Station layout

This elevated station has two tracks and an island platform. The platform has a steel canopy supported by black and green columns in the center. 

To the northeast (railroad south) of the station, the BMT Myrtle Avenue Line curves east to leave the street grid and continue as an elevated structure over the former grade level steam dummy Lutheran Cemetery Line. Southwest of the station, there is space for a center track.

Exits
The station's only entrance/exit is an elevated wooden mezzanine beneath the tracks. It has two staircases to the platform with doors on the landings, turnstile bank, token booth, and two street stairs to the southwest and northeast corners of Palmetto Street and Seneca Avenue.

References

External links 
 
 
 Station Reporter — M Train
 The Subway Nut — Seneca Avenue Pictures
 Seneca Avenue entrance from Google Maps Street View
 Platform from Google Maps Street View

BMT Myrtle Avenue Line stations
New York City Subway stations in Queens, New York
Railway stations in the United States opened in 1915
1915 establishments in New York City
Ridgewood, Queens